This list exhibits the National Basketball Association's top rookie single-season scoring averages based on at least 70 games played or 1,400 points scored. The NBA began recording 3-point field goals during the  season.

See also
National Basketball Association

References

External links
Basketball-Reference.com

National Basketball Association top rookie scoring averages
National Basketball Association statistical leaders